Dave McMahon (born May 1964) is a Canadian biathlete who competed for CAN 1989–1994. He was 7 time Provincial Champion and 5 time Canada Cup Overall winner, NORAM champion and Canadian National Biathlon Champion in 1993. He was ranked 3rd in the World for Summer Biathlon (trail running and shooting) in 1991. Dave McMahon also raced for Canada in cross-country skiing, snowshoeing, trail running, and winter triathlon. Since 1994, he has been the head coach of the  Natural Fitness Lab in Canada.

References

1964 births
Canadian male biathletes
Living people